Hatamabad (also Romanized as Ḩātamābād) is a village in Barez Rural District, Manj District, Lordegan County, Chaharmahal and Bakhtiari Province, Iran. At the 2006 census, its population was 257, in 45 families.

References 

Populated places in Lordegan County